Lipalian Mountain is a  mountain summit located in Banff National Park, in the Slate Range of the Canadian Rockies of Alberta, Canada. It was named by William C. Gussow in 1958. Lipalian was a geological era proposed by American paleontologist Charles Walcott for a time where there is no record of fossils during a period of the Cambrian explosion. The theory was later refuted.


Geology

The mountains in Banff Park are composed of sedimentary rock laid down during the Precambrian to Jurassic periods. Formed in shallow seas, this sedimentary rock was pushed east and over the top of younger rock during the Laramide orogeny.

Climate

Based on the Köppen climate classification, the mountain experiences a subarctic climate with cold, snowy winters, and mild summers. The Lake Louise Ski Resort is located to the immediate northwest of the peak. Temperatures can drop below -20 °C with wind chill factors below -30 °C in the winter.

See also
Geography of Alberta

References

External links
 Parks Canada web site: Banff National Park

Two-thousanders of Alberta
Mountains of Banff National Park